Denis Hurley (born 10 May 1933) is an Irish former hurler, Gaelic footballer and selector. At club he level he played with Sarsfields, Glanmire and Imokilly and was also a member of the Cork senior hurling team.

Playing career

Born and raised in Riverstown, Hurley's father had played with the Sarsfields club and was goalkeeper for the Cork junior hurling team that lost the 1929 All-Ireland junior final to Offaly. It was as a student at Christian Brothers College that he became involved in athletics and he won Munster and national titles over 100 yards and 220 yards. After leaving school Hurley gave up athletics to concentrate on Gaelic games and he won Cork SHC titles with Sarsfields in 1951 and 1957. He first appeared on the inter-county scene as sub-goalkeeper on the Cork minor hurling team during the 1950 Munster MHC. Hurley later made a number of appearances for the Cork senior hurling team in the National Hurling League and various tournament games and was goalkeeping understudy to Mick Cashman for the 1962 Munster SHC.

Management career

Hurley's first season as a member of the Cork senior hurling team selection committee ended with the team winning the 1966 All-Ireland SHC title. He served as a selector at various times over a 27-year period and was also part of All-Ireland SHC-winning teams in 1976, 1984 and 1990. During Hurley's tenure as a selector, Cork also won eight Munster SHC titles and the National Hurling League.

Honours

Player

Sarsfields
Cork Senior Hurling Championship: 1951, 1957

Selector

Cork
All-Ireland Senior Hurling Championship: 1966, 1976, 1984, 1990
Munster Senior Hurling Championship: 1966, 1976, 1982, 1983, 1984, 1985, 1990, 1992
National Hurling League: 1992-93

References

1933 births
Living people
Dual players
Sarsfields (Cork) hurlers
Glanmire Gaelic footballers
Imokilly Gaelic footballers
Cork inter-county hurlers
Hurling goalkeepers
Hurling selectors